Mount Auburn Hospital in Cambridge, Massachusetts, is a teaching hospital of Harvard Medical School. It was founded by Civil War nurse and administrator Emily Elizabeth Parsons as the first hospital in Cambridge in 1866. It was reopened in 1886  and until 1947 was known as Cambridge Hospital.

CareGroup, Inc. is the parent non-profit holding company for Mount Auburn Hospital, Beth Israel Deaconess Medical Center, Beth Israel Deaconess Hospital-Milton, Beth Israel Deaconess Hospital-Needham, and New England Baptist Hospital.

King Bhumibol Adulyadej, the former King of Thailand, was born at Mount Auburn Hospital.

Notable births
 King Bhumibol Adulyadej, former King of Thailand. His father, Prince Mahidol Adulyadej of Siam, Prince of Songkla,  was attending Harvard as a public health and medical student.
 Steven Wright, award-winning comedian

Radiology Department

The Department of Radiology was founded by Dr. Richard Schatzki.  He was the first to describe the most common cause of difficulty swallowing, now known as the Schatzki ring.  The department has an active radiology residency program.

References

External links
 

Hospital buildings completed in 1886
Hospitals in Middlesex County, Massachusetts
Buildings and structures in Cambridge, Massachusetts
Harvard Medical School
Hospitals established in 1886
Teaching hospitals in Massachusetts